Crystalized is the fifteenth and final season of the computer-animated Ninjago television series (titled Ninjago: Masters of Spinjitzu before the eleventh season). The series was created by Michael Hegner and Tommy Andreasen. The season aired in two parts: the first in May 2022, and the other from September to October 2022. Following the passing of Kirby Morrow, the season is the first in the series to feature Andrew Francis as the new voice actor of Cole. Although Crystalized marks the conclusion of the original Ninjago series, it is not the final installment of the Ninjago franchise, as a new series for the Lego Ninjago brand is set to premiere in 2023.

The storyline of the fifteenth season directly follows on from the preceding season, Seabound, which involved the ninja character Nya becoming one with the sea and being lost to the ninja team. The first part of Crystalized focuses on the ninja attempting to save Nya by restoring her to her human form, breaking the law and becoming wanted fugitives in the process. The rest of the season centers around the return of the ninja's old enemy, the Overlord, under a new alias called the Crystal King, as he assembles some of the greatest adversaries from the ninja's past to defeat them once and for all and conquer Ninjago. Lloyd is the focus character of the season, with the Overlord, his Crystal Council (consisting of previous Ninjago antagonists Harumi, Pythor, Aspheera, Vangelis, Mr. F, and the Mechanic), and the Crystal Army serving as the season's primary antagonists.

Voice cast

Main 
 Sam Vincent as Lloyd Garmadon, the Green Ninja
 Vincent Tong as Kai, the red ninja and Elemental Master of Fire and Nya's brother.
 Michael Adamthwaite as Jay, the blue ninja, Elemental Master of Lightning and Nya's yang/boyfriend
 Brent Miller as Zane, the white ninja and Elemental Master of Ice
 Andrew Francis as Cole, the black ninja and Elemental Master of Earth
 Kelly Metzger as Nya, the Elemental Master of Water, Kai's sister and Jay's yin/girlfriend
 Paul Dobson as Sensei Wu, the wise teacher of the ninja
 Jennifer Hayward as P.I.X.A.L. a female nindroid, and Zane's love interest.
 Mark Oliver as Garmadon

Supporting 
 Erin Mathews as Miss Demeanor
 Kelly Sheridan as Gayle Gossip
 Michael Donovan as Police Commissioner
 Alan Marriott as Dareth
 Michael Dobson as Pythor P. Chumsworth
 Heather Doerksen as Skylor
 Paul Dobson as Warden Noble
 Adrian Petriw as Fugi-Dove
 Michael Antonakos as The Mechanic
 Brian Drummond as Twitchy Tim
 Deven Mack as King Vangelis
 Britt McKillip as Harumi
 Lee Tockar as Cyrus Borg
 David Raynolds as Nelson
 Shannon Chan Kent as Racer Seven
 Gavin Langelo as Vinny
 Sharon Alexander as Ultra Violet
 Nicholas Holmes as Jake
 Tabitha St. Germain as Sammy
 Brynna Drummond as Antonia
 Brian Dobson as Ronin

Casting 
The season features the return of the main cast, who have voiced the ninja characters across the series, excluding Kirby Morrow as the character Cole. Crystalized was the first season to feature Andrew Francis as the character's voice actor. Francis was cast in the role following the loss of Morrow, who had previously voiced the character since the beginning of the series. Series co-creator Tommy Andreasen released an open letter to fans explaining the decision to recast the part of Cole. He stated that several options had been considered regarding the character's future, including retiring the character, using existing dialogue from previous seasons to retain Morrow's voice in the series, creating a story where Cole does not speak, or recasting. The Ninjago team made the ultimate decision to recast the part. Andreasen explained, "We must remain true to the character Kirby shaped. Cole is crucial in the 2022 story and the World and Ninjago need Cole. So, recasting it was! And a very hard and emotional one at that."

Andreasen revealed on Twitter that a new actor voicing a new character would be introduced in the season, which he described as, "one of the weirdest and wonderful ones [the writers] have ever come up with." He also revealed that the character Jake would return in the season, voiced by Nicholas Holmes, and that the character Kai would have, "much love and romance in the year to come."

Release 
In January 2021, Tommy Andreasen mentioned the script for the season on Twitter and said that fans would have to wait until 2022 for the season to be released. The Lego Group released several preview clips on its official YouTube channel leading up to the season's premiere, including an official teaser on 29 April 2022, and an official trailer on 20 May 2022. In a France TV Pro press release for the season, which was released in May 2022, an official season poster was revealed that drew comparisons to the design of the theatrical release poster for Avengers: Endgame. The season was scheduled to premiere in France on 6 June 2022. The first twelve English episodes were released online on The Lego Group's YouTube channel on 20 May 2022, with viewing restricted by region but were removed three days later with no explanation, but were made public again on 1 June 2022. On the same day, they were also released on Netflix. It also debuted on CITV in the United Kingdom on 6 June 2022. 

A trailer for the second half of the season was revealed during the Lego Con 2022 live show on 18 June 2022. At Comic Con 2022, it was announced that the second half of the season will be released in early October on Neflix. The 13th and 14th episodes, titled A Sinister Shadow and The Spider's Design, respectively, were released earlier on Sky Go in New Zealand on 18 September 2022. Netflix Australia later confirmed the second half of the season would be released on 1 October 2022.

Plot 

A group called the New Ninja appear in Ninjago City, fighting vengestone smugglers. The ninja team has lost faith and broken up. Nya roams the Endless Sea as a water dragon but begins to recover her memories. She meets a water elemental named Nyad, who helps her to find her way back home. The ninja reunite and uncover a secret shipment of vengestone in a subway tunnel. They are forced to fight Miss Demeanor and her thugs, but are humiliated when the New Ninja defeat the villains.

Nya returns to the monastery in her aqueous form and Zane freezes her to maintain her shape. The team decide to break Aspheera out of Kryptarium prison to steal her staff so that Aspheera can drain Nya's elemental power and return her back to her human form. Skylor helps to keep Nya frozen while they retrieve Aspheera and the staff. During their mission, the ninja are forced to fight the New Ninja and Kai accidentally reveals their identities, making them fugitives. Aspheera agrees to help them in exchange for her freedom and returns Nya to her human form. The New Ninja arrive at the monastery and arrest the entire ninja team except for Nya. Aspheera escapes and is recruited by a stranger known as the Crystal King.

The ninja are sentenced to five years in Kryptarium prison. They find themselves surrounded by their old enemies, including Pythor. Lloyd is visited by the Crystal King's messenger, who warns him that the Crystal King is gathering Lloyd's enemies against him. When Pythor is recruited by the messenger and broken out of prison, the ninja try to stop him, but fail. The ninja eventually escape with the help of Nya, disguised as Samurai X, and Dareth, but find themselves wandering the desert while pursued by sheriff HoundDog McBrag. On the road they are picked up by a young singer who is making her way to Ninjago City and Zane learns the benefits of emotions. The ninja reunite at Twitchy Tim's gas station, where Fugi-Dove helps them escape from McBrag. They confront The Mechanic in his lair and subdue him, allowing Lloyd to impersonate him at the Council of the Crystal King. There he meets the other members, who are Aspheera, Pythor, King Vangelis, and Mr. F, but his identity is discovered and he is captured. The Crystal King's messenger reveals herself to be Harumi, whom Lloyd believed to be dead. 

Harumi explains that, after her death, she was resurrected by the Crystal King and agreed to serve him, even after learning his true identity as the Overlord. Using vengestone bought from Vangelis prior to his defeat by the ninja, Harumi built an army that can negate the ninja's elemental powers. Harumi reveals her plan to steal the Golden Weapons from the monastery and Lloyd vows to stop her. Kai, Jay, Zane, and Cole are attacked by explosive Crystal Spiders, trapping them underground. This enrages Lloyd, who believes his friends to be dead, and awakens his previously dormant Oni powers. The Crystal Council (now joined by the Mechanic) attack the monastery, destroying it and taking the Golden Weapons. Wu, Skylor, and P.I.X.A.L. are saved by MiniPix 7, one of P.I.X.A.L.'s miniature robot assistants, while Nya escapes in her Samurai X armour. As Nya rescues the trapped ninja, Aspheera performs a ritual that corrupts the Golden Weapons and allows the Overlord to take physical form once again.  

The Overlord uses his powers to grant the Crystal Council new abilities, bring the Crystal Army to life, and make the Oni Temple airborne. Lloyd refuses to join him and escapes, taking Harumi with him, and they both fall off the temple into the jungle. The ninja head to Primeval's Eye to rescue Lloyd, just as he and Harumi are found by the Crystal Council. Lloyd is forced to abandon Harumi and escape with his friends, informing them of the Overlord's return. The Crystal Army begins marching towards Ninjago City, corrupting everyone in their path. The ninja try to stop them, but find that their vehicles are being drained by the crystals. Wu and Lloyd track down Garmadon living in an apartment in Ninjago City. Garmadon reveals that since his departure, he has started a journey of self-improvement, by caring for a potted plant he named Christofern. He agrees to help the ninja after the Crystal Army destroys his apartment and damages Christofern. 

Wu theorizes that the powers of Creation and Destruction are the only things that can harm the Overlord, and reaches out to Misako for research on a powerful Dragon form. Meanwhile, Garmadon tries to teach Lloyd how to master his Oni powers, but he is reluctant to give into his negative emotions. After P.I.X.A.L. upgrades the ninja's vehicles to be powered by the crystals instead, they again fight the Crystal Army while Wu confronts the Overlord. The Overlord defeats Wu and unleashes a powerful weapon that crystalizes all of Ninjago City, destroying the ninja's vehicles. Wu takes shelter with a group of paperkids and he broadcasts a message to inspire others. Nya reawakens her elemental powers to save herself and Jay, and they set out to find help. HoundDog McBrag finds Garmadon and Lloyd and tries to arrest the latter, but is left speechless after Lloyd saves him from a crystalized Serpentine. P.I.X.A.L. finds a broken Zane (who has been returned to his Ice Emperor persona) and brings him to Borg Tower. Kai and Cole are rescued by Skylor and join Wu and other refugees at the newspaper warehouse, while Lloyd and Garmadon search for the missing Serpentine.  Wu re-establishes a communication link with the ninja and they decide to reach out to all their allies for help. Cyrus Borg provides Ronin and his fugitives with mechs and fixes Zane before P.I.X.A.L. restores his memory with an emotional outreach. Nya uses her powers to contact the Merlopians, while Racer 7 escorts Cole across Ninjago City to broadcast a distress call to Shintaro. 

The ninja regroup at the warehouse and make their final stand against the Crystal Army, while Lloyd and Garmadon confront the Overlord. Kai, Jay, Zane, and Cole unlock their Dragon forms, defeat the Crystal Council, and restore the Golden Weapons to their original form. The Overlord reveals that he corrupted the Great Devourer in order to make Garmadon evil, causing Harumi to switch sides to help Lloyd and Garmadon. Garmadon is seemingly killed, triggering Lloyd's Oni form, but he resists using his rage to win. The ninja combine the Golden Weapons, releasing their elemental powers to form a four-headed dragon. Lloyd rides the dragon and defeats the Overlord before escaping the crumbling Oni Temple with Harumi and Garmadon, who faked his death. In the aftermath, the ninja's elemental powers return to their source of origin, Garmadon plants Christofern atop a mountain, and the ninja rebuild the monastery alongside their friends and allies.

Episodes

Future 
A new television series for the Lego Ninjago brand was announced by the Ninjago team on the Lego Entertainment Panel at San Diego Comic-Con. The new series will be released in 2023.

See also 
 Lego Ninjago

Notes

References

Primary

Secondary 

Crystalized
2022 Canadian television seasons
2022 Danish television seasons